Belgium was represented by Jean Vallée, with the song "Viens l'oublier", at the 1970 Eurovision Song Contest, which took place in Amsterdam on 21 March. "Viens l'oublier" was chosen at the Belgian national final on 3 February.

Before Eurovision

National final 
The selection process began with six heats of six songs each, from which two songs per heat were chosen to progress by a combination of "expert" jury and postcard voting. Full details of the heats are not currently available. Two semi-finals were then held from which three songs qualified for the final; one chosen by an expert jury, one chosen by postcard voting and one chosen by a panel of 100 young people.

Future Belgian representatives Serge & Christine Ghisoland (1972) and Ann Christy (1975) also took part in the 1970 preselection.

Semi-final 1

Semi-final 2

Final
Serge & Christine Ghisoland and Andrée Simons, who had each qualified two songs for the final, both decided in advance to withdraw one of their songs ("Nous serons toi et moi" and "Perle d'étoile" respectively) in order not to risk splitting their vote, leaving only four songs in the final. The winning song was chosen by a combination of an expert jury and a panel of 600 TV viewers.

At Eurovision 
On the night of the final Vallée performed 5th in the running order, following Yugoslavia and preceding France. At the close of voting "Viens l'oublier" had received 5 points (3 from France and 1 apiece from Ireland and Luxembourg), placing Belgium joint 8th (with Italy and Monaco) of the 12 entries. The Belgian jury awarded 9 of its 10 points to contest winners Ireland, the highest ever mark given by one country to another under the 10-points-per-jury system.

Voting

References 

1970
Countries in the Eurovision Song Contest 1970
Eurovision